Ernest Sutherland Bates (14 October 1879 – 4 December 1939) was an American academic and writer. He taught English and philosophy at Oberlin College from 1903 to 1905, the University of Arizona until 1915, and the University of Oregon from then until 1925.

Early life and education
Bates was born in Gambier, Ohio, to Cyrus Sutherland and his wife, Lavern Bates. He obtained his A.B. and master's from the University of Michigan, and his PhD in 1908 from Columbia University.

Biography

Bates taught English and philosophy at Oberlin College from 1903 to 1905, the University of Arizona until 1915, and the University of Oregon from then until 1925. After Oregon he became literary editor of the Dictionary of American Biography. He was also associate editor of Modern Monthly and a contributor to the Saturday Review of Literature.

Bates was the co-author, with John V. Dittemore, a former director of the Christian Science church, of Mary Baker Eddy: The Truth and the Tradition (1932), which traces the early history of Christian Science and the life of its founder, Mary Baker Eddy (1821–1910). The book has been praised for its use of original sources, such as manuscript collections of fifteen hundred Eddy letters and hundreds of letters from her students. 

According to historian Ralph Henry Gabriel, writing in 1933, the book "comes very close to being a definitive history of a strangely paradoxical woman." Historian Sydney E. Ahlstrom has described it as a "solidly documented account".

Personal life 
Bates was married to lawyer Rosalind Goodrich Bates in 1914; they had two sons before they divorced in 1919. He died in 1939, aged 60 years.

Bibliography
American Faith: Its Religious, Political, and Economic Foundations (1940)
 The Story of the Supreme Court (1936)
 The Story of Congress, 1789–1935 (1936)
 with John V. Dittemore, Mary Baker Eddy: The Truth and the Tradition (1932)
 (ed.), The Bible: Designed to be Read as Living Literature (1936)
 Life of the Bible (The Biography of the Bible)
 (ed.), Pocket Bible
 The Four Gospels
 Hearst, Lord of San Simeon (co-author) (1936)
 This Land of Liberty (1930)
 The Pageant of the States
 The Friend of Jesus (1925; poetry, published in the UK as The Gospel According to Judas)

References

Further reading
"Ernest Sutherland Bates papers, 1908–1912", Arizona Archives Online.

1879 births
1939 deaths
American biographers
University of Michigan alumni